The Shangani Solar Power Station is a proposed 25 megawatts solar power plant in Zimbabwe. The project is under development by a Zimbabwean independent power producer (IPP), called Shangani Renewable Energy. It is expected that when this power station begins commercial operations, the energy generated here will be sold to the Zimbabwe Electricity Supply Authority (ZESA), for integration into the national grid.

Location
The power station is located in the locality of Ensangu Estate, in Shangani, Insiza District, in Matabeleland South Province.

Overview
As of 2014, Zimbabwe's electricity needs amounted to 2,200 megawatts. Existing installed hydropower and coal-fired thermal stations at that time were only able to supply 75 percent of that need. In order to mitigate prolonged and recalcitrant power blackouts, solar and wind sources of energy are the country's most reliable alternatives.

The owner/developer plans to install a ground-mounted solar panel power station with generation capacity of 25 megawatts. A new 11kV evacuation line will be constructed as part of this project.

Developers
The solar park is under development by a Zimbabwean IPP, Shangani Renewable Energy Private Limited, who also own the power station. When completed the same company is expected to operate and maintain the renewable energy infrastructure project.

Construction costs
The cost of construction for this solar farm is quoted at approximately US$45.2 million.

See also

 List of power stations in Zimbabwe
 Colleen Bawn Solar Power Station

References

External links
 39 solar power projects approved for development in Zimbabwe As of 26 September 2019.

Solar power stations in Zimbabwe
Insiza District
Matabeleland South Province